Like It on Top is Ana Popović's eighth studio album, released on September 14, 2018 on ArtisteXclusive records. The album is a concept album which explores ten different aspects of female empowerment. The album was recorded in Nashville, Tennessee, and produced by Grammy winner Keb' Mo', and features guest appearances by Keb' Mo', Kenny Wayne Shepherd, and Robben Ford.

Track listing

Personnel

Musicians
 Ana Popović – vocals, guitar; slide guitar 
 Keb' Mo' – guitar ; resonator guitar ; vocals 
 Robben Ford – guitar ; vocals 
 Kenny Wayne Shepherd – guitar, vocals 
 Akil Thompson – guitar, electric guitar, acoustic guitar 
 Eric Ramey – bass 
 Michael B. Hicks – keyboards, Rhodes, B3 Wulitzer, background vocals 
 Marcus Finnie – drums 
 Roland Barber – trombone 
 Evan Cobb – saxophone 
 Josh Harner – trumpet 
 Jason Eskridge – background vocals 
 Moiba Mustapha – background vocals 
 Kristin Kenlaw – background vocals 
 Leigh Brannon – background vocals 
 JC Morrissey – background vocals 

Production
 Ana Popović – executive producer
 Keb' Mo' – producer
 Zach Allen – recording and additional recording 
 Mills Logan – mixing 
 Leigh Brannon – production, project manager
 Alex Jarvis – additional recording 
 Kevin Smith – additional recording 
 Dave Gardner – mastering 
 Stéphane Kerrad – artwork and design 
 Michael Roud – photography

Charts

References

2018 albums
Ana Popović albums